Hamida al-Attas, born A'alia Ghanem (1943), is the mother of the deceased al-Qaeda leader, Osama bin Laden.

Biography
Hamida al-Attas came from a Syrian family of citrus farmers, with two brothers and another sister, living in two small coastal villages, Omraneya and Babryon, outside the port of Latakia. She grew up in a family of Alawites, an offshoot of Shia Islam. At age 14, she married Mohammed bin Awad bin Laden in Latakia in 1956 and moved to Saudi Arabia with her husband. She was the tenth wife of Mohammed bin Awad bin Laden. Her husband had many wives and he divorced most of them, as having only four wives at once was in accordance with Muslim law. It has been reported that she was a concubine rather than wife of Mohammed bin Awad bin Laden. She was more cosmopolitan than Mohammed's first three Saudi wives.

Osama bin Laden was her only child with Mohammad bin Laden, and they divorced soon after his birth in 1957; Osama was somewhere between the 17th and the 22nd of the 24 sons which Mohammad would sire. She often spent summers at her brother Naji's home in Latakia and Osama went with her until he was 17. In 1974, when Osama was 17, he married her brother's daughter, 14-year-old Najwa Ghanem, who had been promised to him.

Hamida later married Mohammed al-Attas, a Hadhrami administrator in the fledgling Bin Laden empire, when Osama was four or five; they had three sons and a daughter including Ahmad Mohammed. Osama took an active part in raising his half siblings.

It has been reported that, in the spring or summer of 2001, Osama bin Laden placed a phone call to his mother and in a "very brief conversation" told her "that he [will] not be able to call again for a long time," adding that "great events are about to take place." Following the September 11 attacks, Hamida has said "I disapprove of the ambitions the press ascribe to him, but I am satisfied with Osama, and I pray to God that He will guide him along the right path." She later stated "My life was very difficult because he was so far away from me. [Osama] was a very good kid and he loved me so much." She continued "He was a very good child until he met some people who pretty much brainwashed him in his early 20s. You can call it a cult. They got money for their cause. I would always tell him to stay away from them, and he would never admit to me what he was doing, because he loved me so much." The person Osama met in college was Abdullah Azzam.

See also
 Bin Laden family

References 

1943 births
Living people
Bin Laden family
People from Latakia
Saudi Arabian women
Syrian emigrants to Saudi Arabia
Syrian Alawites

de:Osama bin Laden#Familiäre Herkunft